Günther Krause (born 3 September 1953) is a German engineer, academic, politician and businessman. After the Peaceful Revolution, he entered politics, serving in the Volkskammer and as a senior adviser to Minister-President Lothar de Maizière. In that role, he was a co-signatory to the Unification Treaty. After German reunification, he was elected to the Bundestag and served in various roles in the Helmut Kohl government. He first served as minister for special affairs from 1990 to 1991 and then as minister of transport from 1991 to 1993. He resigned from the office due to numerous scandals. Legal problems and scandals followed after his career in politics, earning him the nickname Sause-Krause.

Former Chancellor of Germany Angela Merkel was his protégée. As leader of the CDU in Mecklenburg-Western Pomerania, he helped her garner the nomination in her constituency. Merkel succeeded him as leader after he resigned.

Early life and education
Krause is a native of Güstrow near Mecklenburg, East Germany. He was born on 3 September 1953 in Halle. He received a PhD in engineering from Wismar University of Technology, Business and Design in 1987.

Career
Krause joined the Christian Democratic Union of East Germany in 1975. He worked as an engineer on computerized planning in housing in Rostock. In 1982, he began to work at his alma mater, Wismar Technology University, and was promoted to the professorship in computer science. Then he became the CDU state chairman from Mecklenburg-Western Pomerania. He served as state secretary and the chief unity negotiator for East Germany's only freely elected government headed by Lothar de Maizière. Krause was also his senior advisor. The Unification Treaty was signed by West German Interior Minister Wolfgang Schauble and Krause on 31 August 1990.

Following the reunification of West and East Germany Krause served at the Bundestag and in its committee on research and technology. He was appointed minister of transport on 18 January 1991 in the fourth cabinet of Helmut Kohl. He was the most prominent eastern German politician in the government and one of the three ministers from East Germany in addition to Angela Merkel (CDU; Minister for Women and Youth) and Rainer Ortleb (FDP; Minister of Education). Krause resigned from the office on 6 May 1993 after his alleged involvement in scandals, and was replaced by Matthias Wissmann, another CDU member, in the post. Krause was the eighth minister to quit the Kohl cabinet in the past 13 months.

In 1993, Krause resigned from politics and public office and began to deal with business. As of 2010, he headed a company on information, advice and project development that is based in Kirchmöser, a district of Brandenburg.

Personal life
Krause married twice and has six children, three from the previous marriage. He lives in Admannshagen in Mecklenburg-Vorpommern with his second wife.

References

External links

20th-century German engineers
21st-century German engineers
1953 births
Living people
Christian Democratic Union (East Germany) politicians
Academic staff of Hochschule Wismar
Businesspeople from Mecklenburg-Western Pomerania
Engineers from Mecklenburg-Western Pomerania
Ich bin ein Star – Holt mich hier raus! participants
Members of the 10th Volkskammer
Members of the Bundestag for Mecklenburg-Western Pomerania
Members of the Bundestag 1990–1994
Members of the Bundestag for the Christian Democratic Union of Germany
People from Halle (Saale)
Transport ministers of Germany